Bostrychus zonatus, the Barred gudgeon, is a species of fish in the family Butidae native to Irian Jaya, Indonesia and Papua New Guinea where it can be found in fresh and brackish waters.  This species can reach a length of  SL.

References

External links
 Photograph

Bostrichthys
Butidae
Freshwater fish of Western New Guinea
Taxonomy articles created by Polbot